The 2018 Colorado House of Representatives elections took place as part of the biennial United States elections. Colorado voters elected state representatives in all 65 of the state house's districts. State representatives serve two-year terms in the Colorado House of Representatives. The Colorado Reapportionment Commission provides a statewide map of the state House here, and individual district maps are available from the U.S. Census here.

A primary election on June 26, 2018 determined which candidates appear on the November 6 general election ballot. Primary election results can be obtained from the Colorado Secretary of State's website.

Following the 2016 state House elections, Democrats maintained effective control of the House with 37 members. However, on March 2, 2018 immediately before being expelled from the legislature in the face of sexual harassment allegations, State Representative Steve Lebsock switched parties to Republican. This forced his replacement to be a fellow Republican. Due to these acts, Republican seats increased from 28 to 29 (Republican Alex Winkler was seated on March 23, 2018 to represent District 34) and Democratic seats decreased from 37 to 36 by election day 2018.

On election day, Democrats expanded their majority by 5 seats, as the party also swept all statewide elections in the state. To claim control of the chamber from Democrats, the Republicans would have needed to net 4 House seats.

Summary of Results

Source:

Incumbents not seeking re-election

Term-limited incumbents
Five Democratic incumbents are term-limited and prohibited from seeking a fifth term.
Dan Pabon (D), District 4
Crisanta Duran (D), District 5
Pete Lee (D), District 18
Dave Young (D), District 50
Millie Hamner (D), District 61

Retiring incumbents

Mike Foote (D), District 12
Paul Lundeen (R), District 19 (Ran for State Senate)
Justin Everett (R), District 22 (Ran for Treasurer)
Jessie Danielson (D), District 24 (Ran for State Senate)
Brittany Pettersen (D), District 28 (Ran for State Senate)
Joseph Salazar (D), District 31 (Ran for Attorney General)
Faith Winter (D), District 35 (Ran for State Senate)
Polly Lawrence (R), District 39 (Ran for Treasurer)
Yeulin Willett (R), District 54
Dan Thurlow (R), District 55 (Ran for State Senate)
Jon Becker (R), District 65

Eliminated at convention
Paul Rosenthal (D), District 9

Closest races 
Seats where the margin of victory was under 10%:
  
  gain
  gain
  gain
  
  
  gain

Detailed Results

District 1

District 2

District 3

District 4

District 5

District 6

District 7

District 8

District 9

District 10

District 11

District 12

District 13

District 14

District 15

District 16

District 17

District 18

District 19

District 20

District 21

District 22

District 23

District 24

District 25

District 26

District 27

District 28

District 29

District 30

District 31

District 32

District 33

District 34

District 35

District 36

District 37

District 38

District 39

District 40

District 41

District 42

District 43

District 44

District 45

District 46

District 47

District 48

District 49

District 50

District 51

District 52

District 53

District 54

District 55

District 56

District 57

District 58

District 59

District 60

District 61

District 62

The Colorado Secretary of State's website does not report any votes for the Republicans in the 62nd House district Primary election.

District 63

District 64

District 65

See also
 United States elections, 2018
 United States House of Representatives elections in Colorado, 2018
 Colorado elections, 2018
 Colorado gubernatorial election, 2018
 Colorado Attorney General election, 2018
 Colorado Secretary of State election, 2018
 Colorado State Treasurer election, 2018
 Colorado State Board of Education election, 2018
 Regents of the University of Colorado election, 2018
 Colorado State Senate election, 2018
 Elections in Colorado

References

House of Representatives
Colorado House of Representatives elections
Colorado House of Representatives